In December 2006, the airline made a formal application to the British Civil Aviation Authority for a licence to operate non-stop flights between UK airports and Ercan International Airport (ECN) in Northern Cyprus. The application was turned down in February 2007.

In April 2008, the airline signed a business contract with a travel agency in Germany called 'Oger Turk Tur'. The point of this contract was to be able to bring more tourists to Northern Cyprus (T.R.N.C.) since Germany is one of the top countries that generates a high level of outbound tourist traffic. According to this contract, Cyprus Turkish Airlines were to fly to 8 new destinations in Germany, with one specially leased aircraft operating up to 14 flights a week. KTHY confirmed that they were also to fly to Cologne/Bonn and Stuttgart (Germany), not forming part of the 8 new charter destinations).

Cyprus Turkish Airlines served the following scheduled destinations (at September 2009):

Asia
Turkey
Adana - Adana Şakirpaşa Airport
Ankara - Esenboğa International Airport
Antalya - Antalya Airport
Dalaman - Dalaman Airport
Gaziantep - Oguzeli Airport
Istanbul - Istanbul Atatürk Airport, Sabiha Gökçen International Airport
İzmir - Adnan Menderes Airport
Kayseri - Erkilet International Airport
Trabzon - Trabzon Airport

Europe
Northern Cyprus
Nicosia - Ercan International Airport (base)
Germany
Cologne/Bonn - Cologne/Bonn Airport
Stuttgart - Stuttgart Airport
United Kingdom
Birmingham - Birmingham Airport [seasonal]
London
London Gatwick Airport
London Heathrow Airport
London Stansted Airport
Manchester - Manchester Airport

Note: All flights to Germany were via Antalya Airport, flights to the United Kingdom were via a variety of airports in Turkey.

References

Lists of airline destinations